Isaac Walraven (1686 – 1765), was an 18th-century painter from the Northern Netherlands.

Biography

According to the RKD, he was a pupil of Jan Ebbelaar and the history painter Gerrit Rademaker. He made copies of old masters and was a jeweler and etcher as well as a painter.	

He died in Amsterdam.

References	
	

Isaac Walraven on Artnet	
	
	

1686 births
1765 deaths
18th-century Dutch painters
18th-century Dutch male artists
Dutch male painters
Painters from Amsterdam